Leonardo Alberto González Antequera (born 14 July 1972) is a Venezuelan football manager and former player who played as a defender. He is the current manager Caracas.

Playing career

Club
Born in Valera, González made his senior debut with Trujillanos in 1992. In 1995 he moved to Caracas, and won four Primera División titles with the club beforer leaving in 2005.

After leaving Caracas, González returned to Trujillanos and was a regular starter until his retirement in 2009.

International
González made his international debut for the Venezuela national team on 23 January 1993, in a 0–0 draw against Peru. He represented the nation in three Copa América editions (1993, 1995 and 1997), and spent eleven years without playing for the side until his last cap in 2008.

Managerial career
After retiring, González worked as an assistant at Trujillanos before being appointed manager of Deportivo La Guaira on 3 June 2014. On 31 July 2016, he was named in charge of Deportivo Lara.

González left Lara on 20 December 2020, after qualifying the club to the Copa Libertadores three times. The following 1 August, he returned to the club in the place of sacked Martín Brignani.

On 23 August 2021, González was named interim manager of the Venezuela national team, replacing José Peseiro. He resigned from Lara on 9 December, and took over Estudiantes de Mérida the following 21 March.

On 1 November 2022, González was named manager of Caracas for the upcoming season.

Honours

Player
Caracas
Venezuelan Primera División: 1996–97, 2000–01, 2002–03, 2003–04

References

External links

1972 births
Living people
People from Valera
Venezuelan footballers
Association football defenders
Venezuelan Primera División players
Trujillanos FC players
Caracas FC players
Venezuela international footballers
Venezuela national football team managers
Venezuelan football managers
Venezuelan Primera División managers
Deportivo La Guaira managers
Asociación Civil Deportivo Lara managers
Estudiantes de Mérida managers
Caracas FC managers